The 1975 Indiana State Sycamores football team represented Indiana State University as an independent during the 1975 NCAA Division II football season. The team was led by third-year head coach Tom Harp and played their home games at Memorial Stadium in Terre Haute, Indiana. The Sycamores finished the season with a 5–5 record.

Schedule

References 

Indiana State
Indiana State Sycamores football seasons
Indiana State Sycamores football